The Roman Catholic Diocese of Lolo is a diocese located in the town of Bumba in the Ecclesiastical province of Mbandaka-Bikoro in the Democratic Republic of the Congo.

History
 February 22, 1937: Established as Apostolic Prefecture of Lolo from the Apostolic Vicariate of Buta
 July 2, 1962: Promoted as Diocese of Lolo

Bishops

Ordinaries, in reverse chronological order 
 Bishops of Lolo (Latin Rite)
 Bishop Jean-Bertin Nadonye Ndongo, O.F.M. Cap. (since 2015.01.29)
 Bishop Ferdinand Maemba Liwoke (1987.08.28 - 2015.01.29)
 Bishop Joseph Ignace Waterschoot, O. Praem. (1962.07.02 – 1987.08.28); see below
 Prefects Apostolic of Lolo (Latin Rite) 
 Fr. Joseph Ignace Waterschoot, O. Praem. (1949.11.21 – 1962.07.02); see above
 Fr. Giacomo Jacobs, O. Praem. (1937 – 1948)

Auxiliary bishop
Ferdinand Maemba Liwoke (1983-1987), appointed Bishop here

See also
Roman Catholicism in the Democratic Republic of the Congo

Sources

 GCatholic.org
 Catholic Hierarchy

Roman Catholic dioceses in the Democratic Republic of the Congo
Christian organizations established in 1937
Roman Catholic dioceses and prelatures established in the 20th century
1937 establishments in the Belgian Congo
Roman Catholic Ecclesiastical Province of Mbandaka-Bikoro